LunaNet is a NASA project and proposed data network aiming to provide a "Lunar Internet" for cis-lunar spacecraft and installations.

It will be able to store-and-forward data to provide a Delay/Disruption Tolerant Network (DTN).
The objective is to avoid needing to preschedule data communications back to Earth.

LunaNet will also offer navigation services, eg. for orbit determination, and navigation on the lunar surface.

Draft interoperability specifications have been issued.

Moonlight is an equivalent ESA project.

See also 
 Deep Space Network, NASA spacecraft communications
 Artemis program, NASA's return to the Moon

References

External links 
 LunaNet draft interoperability specifications

NASA
Spacecraft communication